Swings may refer to:

Swing (seat) (often referred to as "swings"), playground equipment
Swings (rapper) (born 1986), South Korean rapper
Pol Swings (1906–1983), astrophysicist
Bart Swings (born 1991), Belgian speed skater

See also
 Swing (disambiguation)